Estadio José Encarnación "Pachencho" Romero is a sports stadium in Maracaibo, capital of the Zulia state, in Venezuela. The stadium holds 40,800 spectators. The pitch was originally surrounded by both a running track and a scorched concrete cycling track, the latter being replaced with new stands due to the celebration of Copa América 2007.

The building is regarded as national cultural heritage of the Zulia state (code IFA 063,045). And their maintenance responsibility Case runs idem, Foundation attached to the Mayoralty Maracaibo. It was built because of the Bolivarian Sports Games of 1971 and remodeled on the occasion of the Games Central American and Caribbean Maracaibo 1998 in which the national team won a gold medal at the selection of Mexico. His name is in honor of a prominent athlete Zulia dedicated to athletics.

It was one of 9 locations in the Copa América Venezuela 2007 being the headquarters of the Grand Final, where they conducted a classic South American football selections found Argentina and Brazil, where the latter was entitled to defend his champion title Perú 2004.

On 2 July 2007 when he was still in development in the country's Copa América, the President of CONMEBOL Dr. Nicolás Leoz, announced that the Pachencho Romero stadium would host the World Cup Under-15 category 2008.

This stadium is one of many who belong to a conglomerate of several sports stadiums known as Polideportivo Luis Aparicio Jr. where others are also among the Luis Aparicio el Grande (baseball) and Peter Elías Belisario Aponte Gymnasium (basketball).

Expansion and remodeling
Prior to the Copa América, in the stadium renovation work was done to accommodate a total of 40,800 spectators with the addition of two new stands in the large space behind the arc and use the cycling track. In order to obtain the right to host the final, the local committee decided to increase the capacity, putting a platform in the velodrome which disappeared and was replaced by a VIP area with capacity for 8 thousand people. These renovations were made to mark of the 2007 Copa América, where the stadium was used as one of 9 officers and headquarters as the venue that hosted the final.

2007 Copa América 
The stadium was one of the venues for the 2007 Copa América and held the following matches:

External links

 Stadium images

References

Football venues in Venezuela
Buildings and structures in Maracaibo
Copa América stadiums
Event venues established in 1971
1971 establishments in Venezuela
Sport in Maracaibo
Athletics (track and field) venues in Venezuela